

Arthropods

Newly named arachnids

Newly named insects

Archosauromorphs
O. W. Lucas recovers more material which would be referred to Laelaps trihedrodon from Morrison Formation strata near Garden Park, Colorado.

Newly named pseudosuchians

Newly named dinosaurs

Plesiosaurs

Newly named plesiosaurs

Synapsids

Non-mammalian

Footnotes

References
 

1870s in paleontology
Paleontology, 1878 In